Akshaya Bhandar is a suburb of Mysore in Karnataka, India.

Location
Akshaya Bhandar junction and residential suburb are located between Kuvempu Nagar and Saraswathipuram in southern Mysore. Panchamantra road from Kuvempu complex junction meets New Kantharaj Urs Road at Akshaya Bhandar forming a T-junction.

Etymology
Akshaya means everlasting and Bhandar means shop. The reference is to the oldest grocery store of the locality which still operates near the junction.

Educational Organizations
 Gnana Ganga School
 J.S.S.Law College JSS Law College – Law College in Mysore
 Raghavendra PU College
 Kaginele B.Ed College

Other Landmarks

 Bandantamma Temple
 Thaponandan Park
 Vishwanandana Park
 Bhanavi Hospital
 Sri Bandanthamma Kaalamma Community Hall
 Apollo BGS Hospital 
 Sri Adishkathi Sri Bandanthamma Sri Kaalamma Temple

Pincode
There are two post offices in Akshaya Bhandar, namely Saraswathipuram and Tonachikoppal Layout, both with the pin code being 570009.

Transportation
The nearest railway station is Chamarajapuram one kilometer away.
Bus No.62 connects this junction to the city bus station.

Economy
Akshaya Bhandar is an upmarket residential locality with numerous banks, shops and educational institutions around the junction.

See also
 Kuvempunagar
 Jayanagar
 Saraswathipuram

Image gallery

References 

Mysore South
Suburbs of Mysore